Larry Curtis Foss (April 18, 1936 – June 15, 2019) was an American professional baseball player and right-handed pitcher who appeared in eight games in Major League Baseball as a member of the 1961 Pittsburgh Pirates and the 1962 New York Mets expansion team.

Foss graduated from Wichita West High School and attended Wichita State University. He began his pro career in the Pirates' system in 1955. After spending seven seasons in the minor leagues, he was recalled by Pittsburgh in September 1961 and made his MLB debut on September 18 as the Bucs' starting pitcher against the St. Louis Cardinals at Forbes Field. Over seven full innings, Foss allowed five hits and only one earned run, as the Pirates built an 8–1 lead. But in the eighth, Foss walked future Baseball Hall of Famer Stan Musial and gave up a two-run home run to Gene Oliver and left the game with an 8–3 lead. When Pittsburgh held on to win, 8–6, Foss earned his first (and only) victory in the majors. The losing pitcher was another future Hall of Famer, Bob Gibson, then in his first full big-league season.

Foss went back to the minors in 1962. After the Mets acquired him from Pittsburgh via waivers on September 6, Foss appeared in five  more National League games. He lost his only decision in his only start — which came on September 18, 1962, the anniversary of his victory over Gibson, and was also by an 8–6 final score. The 1962 Mets compiled a season record of 40–120, setting a post-1900 record for most losses by a Major League team in a single campaign. 

In Foss' eight MLB games, including four starts, he posted a 1–2 won–lost mark and a 5.33 earned run average. He permitted 32 hits and 18 walks in 27 career innings pitched, and registered 12 strikeouts. He left baseball after the 1963 minor-league season and died on June 15, 2019.

References

External links

1936 births
2019 deaths
Asheville Tourists players
Baseball players from Kansas
Columbus Jets players
Denver Bears players
Douglas Copper Kings players
Las Vegas Wranglers (baseball) players
Lincoln Chiefs players
Macon Peaches players
Major League Baseball pitchers
Missoula Timberjacks players
New York Mets players
People from Reno County, Kansas
Pittsburgh Pirates players
Salt Lake City Bees players
San Jose Pirates players
Savannah Pirates players
Wichita State Shockers baseball players
Wilson Tobs players